Another Sky is the seventh studio album by Irish traditional band Altan. It was released in February 2000 on the Narada Productions label.

Overview
The album title "Another Sky" derives from a line in Steve Cooney's song "Island Girl", which Mairéad Ní Mhaonaigh sings on the album with Cooney himself as accompanist. This album is a slight departure from previous Altan albums, in that there is a Bob Dylan song. The album also features the Scots language song, "Green Grow The Rushes" by Robert Burns. A video was released for the Irish track "Beidh Aonach Amárach".

Another Sky was also mixed by nine-time Grammy Award-winner Gary Paczosa.

Track listing
"Beidh Aonach Amárach (There's a Fair Tomorrow)" (Trad. Irish) – 4:20
"Green Grow the Rushes" (Trad. arr. Robert Burns) – 3:57
"The King of Meenasillagh/Lamey's/The High Fiddle Reel" (Trad./Mairéad Ni Mhaonaigh) – 2:49
"Island Girl" (Steve Cooney) – 4:09
"Eoghainín Ó Ragadáin" (Trad. Irish) – 3:48
"Ten Thousand Miles" (Trad.) – 3:05
"Gusty's Frolics/Con's Slip Jig/The Pretty Young Girls of Carrick/The Humours of Whiskey" (Trad.) – 5:07
Girl From The North Country (Bob Dylan) – 3:28
The Verdant Braes of Screen (Trad.) – 3:25
"The Dispute at the Crossroads/Columba Ward's/ Siuns Reel" (Trad/Ciaran Tourish) – 3:18
"Tiocfaidh an Samhradh (Summer Will Come)" (Trad. Irish) –  3:36
"The Ookpik Waltz" (Trad.) – 4:47
"The Waves of Gola" (Mark Kelly) –  3:44

See tune identifications for this album at irishtune.info.

Album tracks performed live
Altan played live in concert the following tracks: 
"Green Grow the Rushes" 
"Eoghainín Ó Ragadáin"
"Ten Thousand Miles"
"Gusty's Frolics/Con's Slip Jig/The Pretty Young Girls of Carrick/The Humours of Whiskey"
"The Dispute at the Crossroads/Columba Ward's/ Siuns Reel"

Personnel

Altan
Mairéad Ní Mhaonaigh – Fiddle, Vocals
Ciaran Tourish – Fiddle, whistle, backing vocals
Dermot Byrne – Accordion
Ciarán Curran – Bouzouki
Mark Kelly – Guitar, backing vocals
Dáithí Sproule – Guitar, backing vocals

Guest musicians
Steve Cooney – Bass, guitar
Jerry Douglas – Dobro
Jimmy Higgins – Bodhrán
James Hutchinson (musician) - Bass 
Mick Kinsella – Harmonica
Dónal Lunny – keyboards
Neil Martin – Cello, keyboards
Tríona Ní Dhomhnaill – Piano
Mick O'Brien – Uillean pipes
Bonnie Raitt – Slide guitar
String quartet:
Bill Butt
Niamh Nelson
Alan Smale
Gillian Williams

Production
Altan – Producer
Conal Markey – Engineer
Gary Paczosa – Mixer
Doug Sax – Mastering
Dave McKean – Design, illustration
Paul McCarthy – Band Photography
Jan Voster – Landscape Photography

References
Notes

External links
 - Official video
 

Altan (band) albums
2000 albums
Albums with cover art by Dave McKean
Narada Productions albums